Cantamayec Municipality (In the Yucatec Maya language: Zuelania guidonia: "four tamay trees") is one of the 106 municipalities in the Mexican state of Yucatán containing (502.02 km2) of land and located roughly 110 km southeast of the city of Mérida.

History
There is no accurate data on when the town was founded, though it existed before the conquest. At colonization, Cantamayec became part of the encomienda system with the first recorded encomendero being Gonzalo Méndez in 1549. It passed to Gonzalo Méndez de Sandoval in 1607, to Pedro de Loaysa in 1625 and then to Manuel Carrillo de Albornoz in 1648.

Yucatán declared its independence from the Spanish Crown in 1821, and in 1825 the area was assigned to the lower partition of Sotuta Municipality. In 1917, it was designated as its own municipality.

Governance
The municipal president is elected for a three-year term. The town council has four councilpersons, who serve as Secretary and councilors of public works, parks and gardens, nomenclature and public monuments.

Communities
The head of the municipality is Cantamayec, Yucatán.  There are 24 populated areas of the municipality. The most notable, after the seat, include Actún-May, Chác, Chac-Motul, Chacxúl, Chalanté, Chichican, Chimay, Cholul, Dolores, Dzán, Dzidzilché, Jesús Man, Kambul, Kojobchaká, Kulkabapop, Múch, Nenelá, Nicté, Revolución, San Carlos, San Isidro, San José Xikó, San Juan, San Martín, San Pedro, Santa Candelaria, Sodzil, Talek, Tixcacal Pérez, Trinidad, Yokdzonot and Yuyumal. The significant populations are shown below:

Local festivals
Every year from 25 to 28 March the traditional town feast is celebrated.

Tourist attractions
 Church of San Luis, built in the seventeenth century
 Church of San Miguel Arcángel, built in the eighteenth century
 Archaeological site at Ohican
 Cenote Cantamayec
 Cenote Che´n Chiik
 Cenote Cholul 
 Cenote Hunchi Ich
 Cenote Jesús María
 Cenote Kocholá

References

Municipalities of Yucatán